The Subprefecture of M'Boi Mirim is one of 32 subprefectures of the city of São Paulo, Brazil.  It comprises two districts: Jardim Ângela and Jardim São Luís.

The area is serviced by Line 5 of the São Paulo Metro.

References

Subprefectures of São Paulo